Colonel Rowland Ernie Kyrie Money was a British Indian Army officer and administrator. A member of the Indian Staff Corps, He served as acting Lieutenant-Governor of the North-Western Provinces from 27 February 1863 to 7 March 1863.

References 

Administrators in British India
Lieutenant-Governors of the North-Western Provinces
Year of birth missing
Year of death missing
Indian Staff Corps officers